Geostationary Carbon Cycle Observatory (GeoCarb) was a NASA Venture-class Earth observation mission that was designed to measure the carbon cycle. Originally intended to be mounted on a commercial geostationary communication satellite operated by SES S.A., a lack of hosting opportunities drove NASA to seek a standalone spacecraft to carry GeoCarb. GeoCarb was to be stationed over the Americas and make observations between 50° North and South latitudes. Its primary mission was to conduct observations of vegetation health and stress, as well as observe the processes that govern the carbon exchange of carbon dioxide, methane, and carbon monoxide between the land, atmosphere, and ocean. 

GeoCarb was a joint collaboration between NASA's Ames Research Center, Goddard Space Flight Center, and Jet Propulsion Laboratory; the University of Oklahoma; Colorado State University; the Lockheed Martin Advanced Technology Center of Palo Alto, California; and SES Government Solutions (now SES Space & Defense) of Reston, Florida.

On 29 November 2022, NASA announced the cancellation of development of the GeoCarb mission, citing cost overruns and the availability of other options to measure and observe greenhouse gases, like the EMIT instrument on the ISS and the upcoming Earth System Observatory.

See also 

Orbiting Carbon Observatory
Orbiting Carbon Observatory 2
Space-based measurements of carbon dioxide

References

Further reading

External links 
 GeoCarb at NASA's Earth Observing System
 GeoCarb at World Meteorological Organization's OSCAR

NASA programs
Spectrometers
Spacecraft instruments
Satellite meteorology
Greenhouse gases
Cancelled spacecraft